Elias Hanna Syriani (January 7, 1938 – November 18, 2005) was a convicted murderer executed by the U.S. state of North Carolina by lethal injection. He was convicted of the July 28, 1990 murder of his wife, Teresa Yousef Syriani, in Charlotte, North Carolina.

At 67, he was one of the oldest people executed in the United States since 1976. He was also one of the people used by Benetton in their anti-death penalty advertising.

Youth and marriage
Syriani was born in Jerusalem, which at the time was part of the British Mandate of Palestine, into a Syriac Christian family.

When he was 12 his father developed cancer, forcing Syriani, the eldest son, to leave school and go to work. The family moved to Amman, Jordan, where he worked as a machinist. After working in the Jordanian Army for nine years, he left and worked as a machinist for a company in Jordan and also for a radio station, singing in Arabic. In the mid-1970s he decided that he was now financially able to marry. He met Teresa through a mutual friend. She had emigrated to the United States and they exchanged letters and photographs for about three months. She returned to Jordan only two or three weeks before the wedding.

They then moved to the United States, living in Chicago, Illinois, where Teresa lived and dressed according to Middle Eastern tradition. But after moving in 1986 to Charlotte, North Carolina, she took a job at a gas station, dressed in a more American fashion and made friends. Syriani disapproved and the two argued over it.

Crime
Teresa had received a protective order from a North Carolina court requiring that Syriani move out of their home and stay away from her and their four children. Around 11:20 p.m. on July 28, 1990, he drove to the house and found that Teresa was not home so he waited in the driveway. When she returned from work, he blocked her access with his van. After getting out of the van he went over to the car where, through an open window, he stabbed Teresa 28 times with a screwdriver, with their 10-year-old son, John, in the passenger seat. John tried to stop his father but was unable.

John ran from the car and summoned help from his older sister, Rose. He then went to a friend's house and on returning they found Syriani still at the car and still stabbing Teresa. She was still alive, and Syriani stopped his attack, got into his van and left. He drove to a nearby fire station to receive medical attention for cuts and scratches. A fireman testified that Syriani told him that Teresa had assaulted him. The police arrived shortly afterwards and arrested him.

Teresa survived for 28 days before succumbing to a 3-inch (8-cm) deep wound in her brain. One neighbour who saw her in the car said that it looked like she had been shot in the face with buckshot.

Syriani gives a different version of events, testifying at his trial that he did not block Teresa's path, nor did he intend to hurt or kill her on the night. He said that she scratched at his face when he approached the car and then slammed the car door open onto his leg. He claims to only remember striking her three or four times with the screwdriver.

Trial and appeals
Before Teresa's death, Syriani was charged with assault with a deadly weapon with intent to kill. This charge was changed to capital murder after her death. On June 12, 1991 he was sentenced to death in Mecklenburg County Superior Court, with the jury finding as an aggravating factor the crime being especially heinous, atrocious, or cruel. This outweighed the eight mitigating circumstances they also found.

Syriani testified that his wife had hit him almost every day in front of their children and had called the police about him several times. He did admit to hitting her three or four times during their first five years of marriage. The children contradicted him, saying that the marriage was full of instances of domestic violence from both sides. Their middle daughter, Sara, testified in the penalty phase of the trial that during one argument Syriani chased after Teresa with a pair of scissors, in another instance back-handed her while they were in the car and one time threw her down the stairs by her hair. John said that another time, his father threatened Teresa with a bat.

Syriani petitioned for a writ of habeas corpus, arguing that his trial counsel was ineffective and denied him a fair trial. His children said they had forgiven their father and asked that his sentence be commuted. An appeal to the Supreme Court of the United States was denied in October 2005 and the execution date subsequently set for November 18, 2005.

An appeal for clemency was denied by Governor Mike Easley on November 17.

Execution
Syriani was pronounced dead at 2:12 a.m. on November 18, 2005 at the Central Prison. None of his children witnessed the execution, though they did meet him during the previous day, leaving about 11 p.m.

In his final statement he said:

I want to thank God first for everything that happened in my life. I want to thank my children. I want to thank my family, especially my sister, Odeet. I want to thank all the beautiful friends who share with me my sufferings for 15 years and four months and they so encouraged me, specifically Mr. and Mrs. Meg Eggleston who become a sister to me. She helped me a lot to accept everything. I thank everyone from the staff, nurses, chaplains. I thank everyone.

It was the 997th execution in the United States since the Gregg v. Georgia decision.

See also

 Capital punishment in North Carolina
 Capital punishment in the United States
 List of people executed in North Carolina
 List of people executed in the United States in 2005

References

General references
Elias Hanna Syriani. The Clark County Prosecuting Attorney.
Unpublished decision (PDF) for Syriani v. Polk, 2004 WL 2944041 by the United States Court of Appeals for the Fourth Circuit (December 21, 2004)
Report from the National Coalition to Abolish the Death Penalty
Offender Data Screen from North Carolina Department of Correction

1938 births
2005 deaths
People executed for murder
21st-century executions of American people
21st-century executions by North Carolina
People executed by North Carolina by lethal injection
People convicted of murder by North Carolina
American people of Assyrian descent
People from Jerusalem
Jordanian emigrants to the United States